Vesna Milanović-Litre (born 30 May 1986) is a Croatian handball player who plays for Kisvárdai KC and the Croatian national team.

After winning many Croatian championship and Croatian cup trophies in past seasons, Vesna Milanović-Litre started season 2011–12 in best possible way. Besides excellent performances on various preparation tournaments, she was elected in Dream-team as best line-player of the tournament in Metković, where Podravka played against Slovenian champions RK Krim, Montenegrin champions ŽRK Budućnost Podgorica, Serbian champions RK Zaječar and Macedonian champions ŽRK Metalurg.

Achievements
Women's Regional Handball League
Runner-up: 2010–11
Croatian Championship
Winner: 2003–04, 2010–11
Runner-up: 2001–02, 2002–03, 2004–05, 2005–06, 2006–07, 2007–08, 2008–09, 2009–10
Croatian Cup
Winner: 2004–05, 2006–07, 2010–11
Runner-up: 2001–02, 2002–03, 2003–04, 2005–06, 2007–08, 2008–09, 2009–10

References

1986 births
Living people
People from Sinj
Croatian female handball players
Olympic handball players of Croatia
Handball players at the 2012 Summer Olympics
Expatriate handball players
Croatian expatriate sportspeople in Hungary
Croatian expatriate sportspeople in Slovenia
Győri Audi ETO KC players
RK Podravka Koprivnica players